Members of the fourth National Assembly were elected on 27 July 2008. The Cambodian People's Party (CPP) was the largest party with 90 of 123 seats. With five parties, it is the most multi-partisan Assembly.

Composition

List of members
 Cambodian People's Party
 Sam Rainsy Party
 Human Rights Party
 Norodom Ranariddh Party
 FUNCINPEC 

Source: COMFREL

Lists of political office-holders in Cambodia